, also known in short form as , is a Japanese manga series written and illustrated by Daisuke Ashihara.
Individual chapters have been serialized in Weekly Shōnen Jump from February 2013, until November 2016 where it took a two year hiatus due to the author's health; it then returned for five weeks between November and December of 2016, before transferring to Jump Square in December 2018. The chapters are collected into tankōbon volumes published by Shueisha. As of September 2022, twenty-five volumes have been released in Japan. Viz Media has licensed the series, and currently twenty-four volumes have been released in english.


Volume list

Chapters not yet in tankōbon format
These chapters have yet to be published in a tankōbon volume. They were originally serialized in Japanese in issues of Jump Square from August 2022 onward.

References

World Trigger
World Trigger